Zabaykalsky Krai (lit. "Transbaikal krai") is a federal subject of Russia (a krai), located in the Russian Far East. Its administrative center is Chita. As of the 2010 Census, the population was 1,107,107.

The krai was created on March 1, 2008 as a result of a merger of Chita Oblast and Agin-Buryat Autonomous Okrug, after a referendum held on the issue on March 11, 2007. In 2018, the krai became part of the Far Eastern Federal District.

Geography
The krai is located within the historical region of Transbaikalia (Dauria) and has extensive international borders with China (Inner Mongolia and Heilongjiang) (998 km) and Mongolia (Dornod Province, Khentii Province and Selenge Province) (868 km); its internal borders are with Irkutsk and Amur Oblasts, as well as with the Buryatia and the Sakha Republic. The Khentei-Daur Highlands are located at the southwestern end. The Ivan-Arakhley Lake System is a group of lakes lying west of Chita.

History

The first traces of human presence in the area dates to 35-150 thousand years ago. Early evidence was found on the surface of ancient river gravels Gyrshelunki (tributary of the Khilok River) near the city of Chita, near Ust-Menza on the Chikoy River.

Based on toponyms, Zabaykalsky might have once been inhabited by a non documented, extinct Yeniseian language.

Mongolic-related Slab Grave cultural monuments are found in Baikal territory. The territory of Zabaykalsky Krai has been governed by the Xiongnu Empire (209 BC-93 CE) and Mongolian Xianbei state (93-234), Rouran Khaganate (330-555), Mongol Empire (1206-1368) and Northern Yuan (1368-1691). 
Medieval Mongol tribes like Merkit, Tayichiud, Jalairs and Khamag Mongols inhabited in the krai. In the 17th century, some or all of Mongolic-speaking Daurs lived along the Shilka, upper Amur, and on the Bureya River. They thus gave their name to the region of Dauria, also called Transbaikal, now the area of Russia east of Lake Baikal. Today Buryat-Mongols remained in the territory of the krai.

Preliminary work on the unification of the Chita Oblast and Agin-Buryat Autonomous Okrug was started at the level of regional authorities in April 2006. The governor of Chita Oblast Ravil Geniatulin, mayor of the Agin-Buryat Autonomous Okrug Bair Zhamsuyev, head of the regional parliament Anatoly Romanov, and Dashi Dugarov sent a letter to the President of Russia, Vladimir Putin, and on November 17, 2006, he supported the initiative.

A referendum on unification took place on March 11, 2007. In Chita Oblast, "yes" was the predominant answer to the following question:

In Chita Oblast, 90.29% (535,045 voters) of the voters voted for the union versus - 8.89% (52,698 voters) who voted against it. 72.82% of the electorate participated. In the Aga Buryat Autonomous Region 94% (38,814 voters) voted for the union versus - 5.16% (2129 voters). 82.95% of  the electorate voters participated.

On July 23, 2007, Russian President Vladimir Putin signed a federal constitutional law "On Establishment in the Russian Federation of a new subject of the Russian Federation in the merger of Chita Oblast and Agin-Buryat Autonomous Okrug", adopted by the State Duma on July 5, 2007. and approved by the Federation Council on July 11, 2007.

Administrative divisions

Economy
Large companies in the region include the Priargunskoe Mining and Chemical Association, Territorial Generating Company №14, Novo-Shirokinsky mine, Kharanorskaya State District Power Plant, Kharanorskiy coal mine.

Government
Ravil Geniatulin, the Governor of Chita Oblast, was elected Governor of Zabaykalsky Krai on February 5, 2008 by the majority of the deputies of both Chita Oblast Duma and Agin-Buryat Autonomous Okrug Duma. He assumed the post on March 1, 2008. United Russia candidate Natalia Zhdanova was elected governor with 54% of the vote on September 18, 2016.

Demographics
Population: 

According to the 2021 Census, Russians made up 89.2% of the population while Buryats were 7.4%. Other significant groups were Armenians (0.3%), Tatars (0.3%), Ukrainians (0.2%), Kyrgyz (0.2%) and Uzbeks (0.2%) . 118,477 people were registered from administrative databases, and could not declare an ethnicity. It is estimated that the proportion of ethnicities in this group is the same as that of the declared group.

Settlements

2007
Births: 16,652 (14.84 per 1000; 14.87 in urban areas and 14.79 in rural areas).
Deaths: 16,186 (14.42 per 1000; 14.42 in urban areas and 14.44 in rural areas).
Natural Growth Rate: 0.04% per year (0.05% in urban areas and 0.04% in rural areas).

2008
Source:
Births: 17,809 (15.9 per 1000)
Deaths: 16,053 (14.3 per 1000)
NGR: 0.16%
Net Immigration: -3,621

Vital statistics for 2012
Births: 17 706 (16.1 per 1000)
Deaths: 14 310 (13.0 per 1000) 
Total fertility rate:
2010 - 1.87 | 2011 - 1.87 | 2012 - 2.00 | 2013 - 2.01 | 2014 - 2.08 | 2015 - 2.06 | 2016 - 1.98 | 2017 - 1.87 | 2018 - 1.82 | 2019 - 1.74 | 2020 - 1.75

Religion

As of a 2012 survey 25% of the population of Zabaykalsky Krai adheres to the Russian Orthodox Church, 6.25% to Buddhism, 6% declares to be generically unaffiliated Christian (excluding Protestant churches), 2% is an Orthodox Christian believer without belonging to any church or being member of other (non-Russian) Orthodox churches. In addition, 28% of the population declares to be "spiritual but not religious", 17% to be atheist, and 16.15% follows other religion or did not give an answer to the survey.

See also
List of Chairmen of the Legislative Assembly of Zabaikalsky Krai

References

Notes

Sources

 
Krais of Russia
States and territories established in 2008
Russian-speaking countries and territories
2008 establishments in Russia
Russian Far East
Far Eastern Federal District